Although many entries in this List of waste management companies are Multinational corporations, the associated country listing is by location of Management HQ.

Companies

See also
LAWDC contains list of UK local authority waste disposal companies

Waste companies
Waste management